The 2018 New Hampshire Wildcats football team represented the University of New Hampshire in the 2018 NCAA Division I FCS football season. They were led by 20th-year head coach Sean McDonnell and played their home games at Wildcat Stadium. They were a member of the Colonial Athletic Association. They finished the season 4–7, 3–5 in CAA play to finish in ninth place.

Previous season
They Wildcats finished the 2017 season 9–5, 5–3 in CAA play to finish in a tie for fourth place. They received an at-large bid to the FCS Playoffs where they defeated Central Connecticut and Central Arkansas before losing in the quarterfinals to South Dakota State.

Preseason

CAA Poll
In the CAA preseason poll released on July 24, 2018, the Wildcats were predicted to finish in second place.

Preseason All-CAA Team
The Wildcats had three players selected to the preseason all-CAA team including quarterback Trevor Knight being selected as offensive player of the year.

Offense

Trevor Knight – QB

Neil O'Connor – WR

Defense

Quinlen Dean – LB

Award watch lists

Schedule

Game summaries

at Maine

Colgate

at Colorado

at Elon

Holy Cross

Stony Brook

Delaware

at Villanova

James Madison

Albany

at Rhode Island

Ranking movements

References

New Hampshire
New Hampshire Wildcats football seasons
New Hampshire Wildcats football